Levakend is a village in the Dashkasan Rayon of Azerbaijan. Levakend is approximately 3.2 km away from the capital of Dashkasan Rayon, Yukhary-Dashkesan in a straight line. It is also approximately 325 km west of Azerbaijan's capital, Baku in a straight line.

References 

Populated places in Dashkasan District